Svilaj is a settlement in the Croatian municipality of Oprisavci (Brod-Posavina County). According to the 2001 census, the settlement has 290 inhabitants. Svilaj's importance lies in the border checkpoint and a bridge over the nearby Sava river, which bears the internationally important freeway Pan-European Corridor Vc.

See also
Donji Svilaj

References

External links

Populated places in Brod-Posavina County
Bosnia and Herzegovina–Croatia border crossings